Gillian Romaine Tett (born 10 July 1967) is a British author and journalist. She is the chair of the editorial board and editor-at-large, US of the Financial Times.  She writes weekly columns, covering a range of economic, financial, political and social issues and co-founded Moral Money, the FT sustainability newsletter. She has written about the financial instruments that were part of the cause of the financial crisis that started in the fourth quarter of 2007, such as CDOs, credit default swaps, SIVs, conduits, and SPVs. She became renowned for her early warning that a financial crisis was looming. In February 2023, her election was announced as the next Provost of King's College, Cambridge. She is to take up the post in October 2023 in succession to Professor Michael Proctor. She will continue writing for the Financial Times.Early life and education
Tett was born on 10 July 1967. She was educated at the North London Collegiate School, an independent school for girls in Edgware, in the London Borough of Harrow in northwest London, during which time, at the age of 17, she worked for a Pakistani nonprofit.

After leaving school, Tett studied at Clare College, Cambridge, graduating in 1989 with a Bachelor of Arts (BA) degree in Archaeology and Anthropology. 
 She then undertook a Doctor of Philosophy (PhD) degree in Social Anthropology based on field research in Tajikistan in the former Soviet Union. Her doctoral thesis was titled "Ambiguous alliances: marriage and identity in a Muslim village in Soviet Tajikstan". She expressed frustration with an academic anthropology that in her view has been committing "intellectual suicide" and decided instead to pursue a career in journalism.

Life and career
In 1993, Tett joined the Financial Times as a correspondent from the former Soviet Union and Europe. In 1997, she was posted to Tokyo, where she later became bureau chief. In 2003, she became deputy head of the Lex column.  Tett was then U.S. managing editor at the FT, before working as an assistant editor and columnist before returning to the U.S. managing editor position. She is also the chairwoman of the board of trustees for the Knight–Bagehot Fellowship in Economics and Business Journalism with Columbia University.

During the years 2005 to 2007, Tett applied her skills in ethnographic research to J.P. Morgan and discovered that the insular culture was leading to the creation of financial instruments that had little basis and that could cause severe economic disruption. In 2006, she predicted the financial crisis. Her 2009 book Fool's Gold recounts the lead-up to the economic crisis and the eventual collapse. She also played a significant role in the 2010 documentary Inside Job about the financial crisis of 2008.

In 2010 Tett interviewed author Sebastian Mallaby on C-SPAN about his book More Money Than God: Hedge Funds and the Making of a New Elite providing a very clear image of hedge funds. Mallaby introduced "James Simons, founder of the Renaissance Technologies hedge fund and arguably the most successful investor of all time" but who was virtually unknown in 2010.

Tett is a single parent to two daughters.

Fool's Gold
Tett's 2009 book Fool's Gold: How Unrestrained Greed Corrupted a Dream, Shattered Global Markets and Unleashed a Catastrophe was widely reviewed throughout the English-speaking world and won the Spear's Book Award for the financial book of 2009.

 Anthro-Vision: A New Way to See in Business and LifeAnthro-Vision, a New Way to See in Life and Business, published in June 2021, concerns the behaviour of organizations, individuals, and markets by looking through an anthropological lens. Daniel Kahneman praised Anthro-Vision as "a really brilliant book”.

King's College, Cambridge
In February 2023, Tett was announced as the next Provost of King's College, Cambridge, ahead of her assuming the role in October 2023.

Awards and honours
 2007, Wincott prize for financial journalism (capital markets coverage)
 2008, Business Journalist of the Year, British Press Awards
 2009, Journalist of the Year, British Press Awards
 2009, Financial Book of the Year (for Fool's Gold)
 2011, President's Medal of the British Academy.
 2012, Business Communicator of the Year, UK Speechwriters' Guild
 2012, Society of American Business Editors and Writers Award for best feature article, for Madoff spins his story 2013, Honorary doctorate, Baruch College of the City University of New York
 2014, Columnist of the Year, British Press Awards
 2015, Honorary degree, Lancaster University
 2016, Honorary degree, University of Exeter.
 2016, Honorary degree, University of Miami
 2017, Honorary fellowship, Goldsmiths, University of London.
 2017, Tepper School of Business Award for Professional Excellence, Carnegie Mellon University
 2017, Foreign Commentator of the Year, Editorial Intelligence 
 2019, Best in Business Honorees, Newsletter, Moral Money 
 2020, Winner, Newsletter Category, Moral Money 

BooksSaving the Sun: How Wall Street Mavericks Shook Up Japan's Financial World and Made Billions, 2004.Fool's Gold: How Unrestrained Greed Corrupted a Dream, Shattered Global Markets and Unleashed a Catastrophe  (in some markets called Fool's Gold: How the Bold Dreams of a Small Tribe at J.P. Morgan Was Corrupted by Wall Street Greed and Unleashed a Catastrophe, 2010 )The Silo Effect: The Peril of Expertise and the Promise of Breaking Down Barriers, 2015
 Anthro-Vision: A New Way to See in Business and Life'', 2021

See also
John Authers

References

External links

 

1967 births
Living people
People educated at North London Collegiate School
Alumni of Clare College, Cambridge
British expatriates in the United States
British women journalists
British business and financial journalists
British business writers
English financial writers
Women business writers
Women business and financial journalists
Recipients of the President's Medal (British Academy)
Financial Times people
Managing editors